Sphaeropleales is an order of green algae that used to be called Chlorococcales. The order includes some of the most common freshwater planktonic algae such as Scenedesmus and Pediastrum. The Spaeropleales includes vegetatively non-motile unicellular or colonial taxa that have biflagellate zoospores with  flagella that are directly opposed in direction (the DO arrangement): Sphaeroplea, Atractomorpha, Neochloris, Hydrodictyon, and Pediastrum. All of these taxa have basal body core connections.

With an increase in the number of taxa for which sequence data are available, there is evidence of an expanded DO clade that includes additional zoosporic (Bracteacoccus, Schroederia) and some strictly autosporic genera such as Ankistrodesmus, Scenedesmus, Selenastrum, and Monoraphidium. The filamentous Microspora has been allied with the coccoid genus Bracteacoccus based on molecular data.

Monophyly of the DO clade is supported by phylogenetic analysis of multi-gene data.

References

 
Chlorophyta orders